Forfar West End Football Club are a Scottish junior football club based in Forfar, Angus. Their home ground is Strathmore Park.

Up until the end of the 2005–06 season, they played in the Tayside Premier League of the Scottish Junior Football Association's East Region. They had previously finished as champions of the previous Tayside Junior Football League system once, in 1991.

The SJFA restructured prior to the 2006–07 season, and West End found themselves in the 12-team East Region, North Division. They won the championship in their first season in the division and were promoted to the Premier League.

In the 2007–08 season they finished as Runners up in the East Premier League giving them promotion to the Super League, but were relegated again the following season.

After the loss of several players and management staff, the club failed to raise a team on two occasions at the start of the 2011–12 season. At an East Region meeting on 18 October 2011, it was announced that the club were going into abeyance and would withdraw from all competitive fixtures for the remainder of the season.

West End returned the following season in the East Region North Division and worked their way back up to the East Super League in 2017–18 after two promotions in five seasons.

Coaching staff

First-team squad

 (C)
 (on loan from Carnoustie)

References

External links 
 Official site

Football clubs in Scotland
Scottish Junior Football Association clubs
Association football clubs established in 1892
Football clubs in Angus, Scotland
1892 establishments in Scotland
Forfar